The Federal Agency for Maritime and River Transport (Rosmorrechflot), native name: Федеральное агентство морского и речного транспорта is a federal executive body in Russian Federation. It is entrusted to manage state property, maintain transport security-related tasks and provide services in the field of maritime and inland waterway transport. It is under the jurisdiction of the Ministry of Transport of the Russian Federation.

Overview
The Federal agency of maritime and river transportation is responsible for managing state property, providing public services and carry law enforcement functions in maritime and river transportation field. It also has responsibility related to the development of the marine fishing sector and ports. Rosmorrechflot is responsible is the competent authority in the field of maritime and inland waterway transport to fulfill obligations arising from the international treaties of the Russian Federation. Its activities are planned, defined and regulated by the orders of the President of Russian Federation, decisions of Maritime Board, Collegium of the Ministry of Transport, Transport Strategy of the Russian Federation for the period up to 2030 and Federal Program "Development of the Transport System of the Russian Federation (2010–2020 years). Developing a modern and efficient infrastructure for maritime and inland waterway transport is one of its priorities. It also targeted to ensure the availability, volume, and competitiveness of maritime and inland waterway transport in accordance the quality criteria for cargo owners, complying with the innovative development strategy of the Russian Federation. Its works include activities related to integration into the world transport system and transit-related activities.

History

The Council of the People's Commissars for Water Transport, in Russian: Народный комиссариат водного транспорта -Narodnyy Komissariat Vodnovo Transporta, abbreviated Наркомвод -Narkomvod,  was established on 30 January 1931,. It was the Soviet Ministry for Water Transportation and was responsible to maintain marine and river transportation and also for the management of the Soviet merchant marine fleet. On 9 April 1939 the People's Commissariat was abolished and split into the People's Commissariat of River Fleet and the People's Commissariat of Sea Fleet.

The Federal Agency for Maritime and River Transport was established at March 9, 2004 following the Decree of the President of the Russian Federation No. 314, On the system and structure of Federal Executive Bodies.

Structure and management
According to the government resolution No. 371 dated July 23, 2004, Rosmorrechflot reports to the Ministry of Transport of the Russian Federation. Head of the Federal Agency of Marine and River Transport is a Deputy Minister of Transport of the Russian Federation. Current head is Olersky Victor Alexandrovich. Currently head of the Federal Agency for Marine and River Transport is assisted by five deputy heads. Federal Agency for Marine and River Transport is managed by seven departmental heads; Head of the Department of Economics and Finance, And about. Head of the Inland Water Transport Department, And about. Head of Transportation Security Department, Head of Administration, Head of the Department of Seaports and Infrastructure Development, Head of the Department of State Property and Legal Support, Head of Shipping Security Administration. The Federal Agency of Maritime and River Transport established and operates the Board of Rosmorrechflot and four councils; Expert Council, Council for Education, the Council of Captains of Sea Ports and Council of heads of administrations of inland waterways. The Expert Council under the Collegium of the Federal Agency for Maritime and River Transport is an expert body, called upon to interact with business and the public to help find effective solutions in the field of sea and river transport on the basis of interaction between the state and business. The Council of Captains of Sea Ports, the Council for Education and the Council of the Managers of the Administrations of the Inland Waterways, consult formation of a unified policy in the field of port control, maritime safety, development of sectoral education and development of inland waterways.

Area of Activities and Functions
Activities of Federal Agency for Maritime and River Transport are Administration of seaports, Issue of permits for navigation, Maritime Rescue Service and coordination, prevention and liquidation of oil and oil products spills into the sea, search and rescue services, certification/attestation of rescue services, rescue units, rescuers and citizens acquiring the status of a rescuer engaged in search and rescue, maintenance of marine activities, Register of sea lines, Administration of inland waterways, Certification of captains of inland navigation vessels, crew members certification for river vessels,  Rosmorrechflot Spatial Data Foundation, Construction, development and maintenance of Infrastructures in the field of maritime transport, river ports Construction, development and maintenance and operations, Sea port operations, Diplomacy certification of ship crew members, Icebreaking support, Inland waterways traffic regulation, Infrastructure projects in inland waterway transport, Register of seaports, Bunker Fuel Suppliers Registry, services provided in ports. Management of Educational organizations of Rosmorrechflot; State University of the Marine and River Fleet named after Admiral S.O. Makarova, the State Maritime University named after Admiral F.F. Ushakov, Maritime State University named after Admiral GI. Nevelskoy, Volga State University of Water Transport, Siberian State University of Water Transport and Educational & methodological center for maritime and river transport. Providing training programs, Setting Professional standards, Operation of Training vessels, Recognition of marine educational organizations, Survey of facilities and centers, approval of equipment types.

See also 

 Ministry of the Maritime Fleet (Soviet Union)

References

Bibliography

External links 

Government agencies of Russia
Federal executive bodies of Russia
Water transport in Russia